James Sanders House is a historic home located at Little Falls in Herkimer County, New York. The house is a two-story, gable-roofed brick residence, five bays long and two bays wide, originally constructed in 1827.  It consists of a rectangular main block with a two-story brick rear wing.  It features a center hall plan and Federal-style decorative elements.  Also on the property are a frame, gable-roofed carriage barn and garage/agricultural equipment barn.  James Sanders was a local building contractor who also built a number of mills, residences, and civic buildings including the original Little Falls Academy.

It was listed on the National Register of Historic Places in 2006.  It is located in the Little Falls Historic District.

References

Houses on the National Register of Historic Places in New York (state)
Federal architecture in New York (state)
Houses completed in 1827
Houses in Herkimer County, New York
National Register of Historic Places in Herkimer County, New York
1827 establishments in New York (state)